Ziethen is a municipality in the district of Barnim in Brandenburg in Germany.

Demography

References

Localities in Barnim